Linnaean taxonomy can mean either of two related concepts: 
 The particular form of biological classification (taxonomy) set up by Carl Linnaeus, as set forth in his Systema Naturae (1735) and subsequent works. In the taxonomy of Linnaeus there are three kingdoms, divided into classes, and they, in turn, into lower ranks in a hierarchical order.
 A term for rank-based classification of organisms, in general. That is, taxonomy in the traditional sense of the word: rank-based scientific classification. This term is especially used as opposed to cladistic systematics, which groups organisms into clades. It is attributed to Linnaeus, although he neither invented the concept of ranked classification (it goes back to Plato and Aristotle) nor gave it its present form. In fact, it does not have an exact present form, as "Linnaean taxonomy" as such does not really exist: it is a collective (abstracting) term for what actually are several separate fields, which use similar approaches.

Linnaean name also has two meanings: depending on the context, it may either refer to a formal name given by Linnaeus (personally), such as Giraffa camelopardalis Linnaeus, 1758, or a formal name in the accepted nomenclature (as opposed to a modernistic clade name).

The taxonomy of Linnaeus 

In his Imperium Naturae, Linnaeus established three kingdoms, namely Regnum Animale, Regnum Vegetabile and Regnum Lapideum. This approach, the Animal, Vegetable and Mineral Kingdoms, survives today in the popular mind, notably in the form of the parlour game question: "Is it animal, vegetable or mineral?". The work of Linnaeus had a huge impact on science; it was indispensable as a foundation for biological nomenclature, now regulated by the nomenclature codes. Two of his works, the first edition of the Species Plantarum (1753) for plants and the tenth edition of the Systema Naturae (1758), are accepted as part of the starting points of nomenclature; his binomials (names for species) and generic names take priority over those of others. However, the impact he had on science was not because of the value of his taxonomy.

Linnaeus' kingdoms were in turn divided into classes, and they, in turn, into orders, genera (singular: genus), and species (singular: species), with an additional rank lower than species, though these do not precisely correspond to the use of these terms in modern taxonomy.

Classification of plants 

His classes and orders of plants, according to his Systema Sexuale, were never intended to represent natural groups (as opposed to his ordines naturales in his Philosophia Botanica) but only for use in identification. They were used for that purpose well into the nineteenth century. Within each class were several orders. This system is based on the number and arrangement of male (stamens) and female (pistils) organs.

The Linnaean classes for plants, in the Sexual System, were (page numbers refer to Species plantarum): 
 Classis 1. Monandria: flowers with 1 stamen
 Classis 2. Diandria: flowers with 2 stamens
 Classis 3. Triandria: flowers with 3 stamens
 Classis 4. Tetrandria: flowers with 4 stamens
 Classis 5. Pentandria: flowers with 5 stamens
 Classis 6. Hexandria: flowers with 6 stamens
 Hexandria monogynia pp. 285–352
 Hexandria polygynia pp. 342–343
 Classis 7. Heptandria: flowers with 7 stamens
 Classis 8. Octandria: flowers with 8 stamens
 Classis 9. Enneandria: flowers with 9 stamens
 Classis 10. Decandria: flowers with 10 stamens
 Classis 11. Dodecandria: flowers with 11 to 19 stamens
 Classis 12. Icosandria: flowers with 20 (or more) stamens, perigynous
 Classis 13. Polyandria: flowers with many stamens, inserted on the receptacle
 Classis 14. Didynamia: flowers with 4 stamens, 2 long and 2 short
 Gymnospermia
 Angiospermia 
 Classis 15. Tetradynamia: flowers with 6 stamens, 4 long and 2 short 
 Classis 16. Monadelphia; flowers with the anthers separate, but the filaments united, at least at the base
 Pentandria 
 Decandria 
 Polyandria
 Classis 17. Diadelphia; flowers with the stamens united in two separate groups
 Hexandria
 Octandria 
 Decandria 
 Classis 18. Polyadelphia; flowers with the stamens united in several separate groups
 Pentandria
 Icosandria 
 Polyandria
 Classis 19. Syngenesia; flowers with stamens united by their anthers
 Polygamia aequalis 
 Polygamia superba
 Polygamia frustranea
 Polygamia necessaria
 Monogamia
 Classis 20. Gynandria; flowers with the stamens united to the pistils
 Classis 21. Monoecia: monoecious plants
 Classis 22. Dioecia: dioecious plants
 Classis 23. Polygamia: polygamodioecious plants
 Classis 24. Cryptogamia: the "flowerless" plants, including ferns, fungi, algae, and bryophytes

The classes based on the number of stamens were then subdivided by the number of pistils, e.g. Hexandria monogynia with six stamens and one pistil. Index to genera p. 1201

By contrast his ordines naturales numbered 69, from Piperitae to Vagae.

Classification for animals 

Only in the Animal Kingdom is the higher taxonomy of Linnaeus still more or less recognizable and some of these names are still in use, but usually not quite for the same groups. He divided the Animal Kingdom into six classes, in the tenth edition, of 1758, these were:
 Classis 1. Mammalia (mammals)
 Classis 2. Aves (birds)
 Classis 3. Amphibia (amphibians)
 Classis 4. Pisces
 Classis 5. Insecta
 Classis 6. Vermes

Classification for minerals 
His taxonomy of minerals has long since dropped from use. In the tenth edition, 1758, of the Systema Naturae, the Linnaean classes were:

 Classis 1. Petræ
 Classis 2. Mineræ
 Classis 3. Fossilia
 Classis 4. Vitamentra

Rank-based scientific classification 

This rank-based method of classifying living organisms was originally popularized by (and much later named for) Linnaeus, although it has changed considerably since his time. The greatest innovation of Linnaeus, and still the most important aspect of this system, is the general use of binomial nomenclature, the combination of a genus name and a second term, which together uniquely identify each species of organism within a kingdom. For example, the human species is uniquely identified within the animal kingdom by the name Homo sapiens. No other species of animal can have this same binomen (the technical term for a binomial in the case of animals). Prior to Linnaean taxonomy, animals were classified according to their mode of movement.

Linnaeus's use of binomial nomenclature was anticipated by the theory of definition used in Scholasticism. Scholastic logicians and philosophers of nature defined the species human, for example, as Animal rationalis, where animal was considered a genus and rationalis (Latin for "rational") the characteristic distinguishing humans from all other animals. Treating animal as the immediate genus of the species human, horse, etc. is of little practical use to the biological taxonomist, however. Accordingly, Linnaeus's classification treats animal as a class including many genera (subordinated to the animal "kingdom" via intermediary classes such as "orders"), and treats homo as the genus of a species Homo sapiens, with sapiens (Latin for "knowing" or "understanding") playing a differentiating role analogous to that played, in the Scholastic system, by rationalis (the word homo, Latin for "human being", was used by the Scholastics to denote a species, not a genus).

A strength of Linnaean taxonomy is that it can be used to organize the different kinds of living organisms, simply and practically. Every species can be given a unique (and, one hopes, stable) name, as compared with common names that are often neither unique nor consistent from place to place and language to language. This uniqueness and stability are, of course, a result of the acceptance by working systematists (biologists specializing in taxonomy), not merely of the binomial names themselves, but of the rules governing the use of these names, which are laid down in formal nomenclature codes.

Species can be placed in a ranked hierarchy, starting with either domains or kingdoms. Domains are divided into kingdoms. Kingdoms are divided into phyla (singular: phylum) — for animals; the term division, used for plants and fungi, is equivalent to the rank of phylum (and the current International Code of Botanical Nomenclature allows the use of either term). Phyla (or divisions) are divided into classes, and they, in turn, into orders, families, genera (singular: genus), and species (singular: species). There are ranks below species: in zoology, subspecies (but see form or morph); in botany, variety (varietas) and form (forma), etc.

Groups of organisms at any of these ranks are called taxa (singular: taxon) or taxonomic groups.

The Linnaean system has proven robust and it remains the only extant working classification system at present that enjoys universal scientific acceptance. However, although the number of ranks is unlimited, in practice any classification becomes more cumbersome the more ranks are added. Among the later subdivisions that have arisen are such entities as phyla, families, and tribes, as well as any number of ranks with prefixes (superfamilies, subfamilies, etc.). The use of newer taxonomic tools such as cladistics and phylogenetic nomenclature has led to a different way of looking at evolution (expressed in many nested clades) and this sometimes leads to a desire for more ranks. An example of such complexity is the scheme for mammals proposed by McKenna and Bell.

Alternatives 
Over time, understanding of the relationships between living things has changed. Linnaeus could only base his scheme on the structural similarities of the different organisms. The greatest change was the widespread acceptance of evolution as the mechanism of biological diversity and species formation, following the 1859 publication of Charles Darwin's On the Origin of Species. It then became generally understood that classifications ought to reflect the phylogeny of organisms, their descent by evolution. This led to evolutionary taxonomy, where the various extant and extinct are linked together to construct a phylogeny. This is largely what is meant by the term 'Linnaean taxonomy' when used in a modern context.
In cladistics, originating in the work of Willi Hennig, 1950 onwards, each taxon is grouped so as to include the common ancestor of the group's members (and thus to avoid phylogeny). Such taxa may be either monophyletic (including all descendants) such as genus Homo, or paraphyletic (excluding some descendants), such as genus Australopithecus.

Originally, Linnaeus established three kingdoms in his scheme, namely for Plants, Animals and an additional group for minerals, which has long since been abandoned.  Since then, various life forms have been moved into three new kingdoms: Monera, for prokaryotes (i.e., bacteria); Protista, for protozoans and most algae; and Fungi.  This five kingdom scheme is still far from the phylogenetic ideal and has largely been supplanted in modern taxonomic work by a division into three domains: Bacteria and Archaea, which contain the prokaryotes, and Eukaryota, comprising the remaining forms. These arrangements should not be seen as definitive. They are based on the genomes of the organisms; as knowledge on this increases, classifications will change.

Representing presumptive evolutionary relationships within the framework of Linnaean taxonomy is sometimes seen as problematic, especially given the wide acceptance of cladistic methodology and numerous molecular phylogenies that have challenged long-accepted classifications. Therefore, some systematists have proposed a PhyloCode to replace it.

See also 
 History of plant systematics
 Phylogenetic tree – a way to express insights into evolutionary relationships
 Zoology mnemonic for a list of mnemonic sentences used to help people remember the list of Linnaean ranks.

References

Bibliography 

Books
 
  
 
 

 Dawkins, Richard. 2004. The Ancestor's Tale: A Pilgrimage to the Dawn of Life. Boston: Houghton Mifflin. 
 Ereshefsky, Marc. 2000. The Poverty of the Linnaean Hierarchy: A Philosophical Study of Biological Taxonomy. Cambridge: Cambridge University Press.
 Gould, Stephen Jay. 1989. Wonderful Life: The Burgess Shale and the Nature of History. W. W. Norton & Co. 
 Pavord, Anna. The Naming of Names: The Search for Order in the World of Plants. Bloomsbury. 
Articles
 
 
Websites

External links 

 International Code of Botanical Nomenclature (Saint Louis Code), Electronic version
 International Code of Nomenclature for algae, fungi, and plants (Melbourne Code, 2011), Electronic version
 ICZN website, for zoological nomenclature
 Text of the ICZN, Electronic version
 ZooBank: The World Register of Animal Names
 International Committee on Systematics of Prokaryotes for bacteria
 International Code of Zoological Nomenclature. 4th Edition. By the International Union of Biological Sciences
 ICTVdB website, for virus nomenclature by the International Union of Microbiological Societies
 Tree of Life
 European Species Names in Linnaean, Czech, English, German and French

Taxonomy
Taxonomy (biology)
Biological nomenclature
Botanical nomenclature
Zoological nomenclature
Swedish inventions